Yuma County is the name of two counties in the United States:

 Yuma County, Arizona
 Yuma County, Colorado